is a former Japanese football player.

Club statistics

References

External links

1980 births
Living people
Association football people from Kagoshima Prefecture
Japanese footballers
J1 League players
J2 League players
Osaka Gas SC players
JEF United Chiba players
Mito HollyHock players
Association football midfielders
People from Kagoshima